Night Hawk is a fictional character created by John James Brearley Garbutt and appeared in the boys' paper Nelson Lee in the early 1930s. The hero was rich scientist Thurston Kyle who built an armored, winged flying suit to fight crime. The character first appeared in The Nelson Lee Library (New Series) No. 11, April 5, 1930 in a self-titled story. 

Night Hawk appeared in the magazine from 1930-1931, including a serial, "The Phantom Foe", which ran from issues No. 69 (May 23, 1931) to No. 83 (August 22, 1931). The latter issue was his last appearance. Stories were reprinted later in The Boys' Friend Library.

Four new Night Hawk stories were published in 2014.

Appearances

 The Nelson Lee Library No. 11 (New Series), April 5, 1930, "The Night Hawk! The Winged Avenger!"
 The Nelson Lee Library No. 12 (New Series), April 12, 1930, "The Night Hawk! Hurled to Destruction!"
 The Nelson Lee Library No. 13 (New Series), April 19, 1930, "The Night Hawk! Menace of the Underseas!"
 The Nelson Lee Library No. 14 (New Series), April 26, 1930, "The Night Hawk! Snub Hawkins' Joy Ride!"
 The Nelson Lee Library No. 15 (New Series), May 3, 1930, "The Night Hawk! Floating Death!"
 The Nelson Lee Library No. 16 (New Series), May 10, 1930, "The Night Hawk! The Midnight Raid!"
 The Nelson Lee Library No. 17 (New Series), May 17, 1930, "The Night Hawk! The Last Round!"
 The Nelson Lee Library No. 32 (New Series), August 30, 1930, "Rays of Death".
 The Nelson Lee Library No. 36 (New Series), September 27, 1930, "Unmasked".
 The Nelson Lee Library No. 40 (New Series), October 25, 1930, "The Avenger".
 The Nelson Lee Library No. 43 (New Series), November 15, 1930, "The Last Round".
 The Nelson Lee Library No. 51 (New Series), January 10, 1931, "Terror by Night".
 The Nelson Lee Library No. 52 (New Series), January 17, 1931.
 The Nelson Lee Library No. 53 (New Series), January 24, 1931, "Hovering Doom".
 The Nelson Lee Library No. 54 (New Series), January 31, 1931.
 The Nelson Lee Library No. 55 (New Series), February 7, 1931, "Honours Divided".
 The Nelson Lee Library No. 56 (New Series), February 14, 1931, "Terror of the Skies".
 The Nelson Lee Library No. 57 (New Series), February 21, 1931, "A Fight for a Throne".
 The Nelson Lee Library No. 58 (New Series), February 28, 1931, "The Night Hawk's Revenge!".
 The Nelson Lee Library No. 59 (New Series), March 7, 1931, "The Radium Robbers".
 The Nelson Lee Library No. 60 (New Series), March 14, 1931, "Kittens' Prey".
 The Nelson Lee Library No. 61 (New Series), March 21, 1931, "The House of Mystery".
 The Nelson Lee Library No. 62 (New Series), March 28, 1931, "The Lost Explorer".
 The Nelson Lee Library No. 63 (New Series), April 4, 1931, "The Menace of Nagir".
 The Nelson Lee Library No. 64 (New Series), April 11, 1931, "Jungle Justice".
 The Nelson Lee Library No. 69 (New Series), May 23, 1931, through No. 83, August 22, 1931, serial "The Phantom Foe".
 Night Hawk by John James Brearley Garbutt and Joseph Lovece, 2014, Createspace. Four reprints plus four new stories.
 The Boys' Friend Library No. 352, September 1, 1932, The Night Hawk (reprint).
 The Boys' Friend Library No. 362, December 1, 1932, The Phantom Foe (reprint).
 The Boys' Friend Library No. 379, April 6, 1933, The Winged Avenger (reprint).

References

Pulp stories
Fictional detectives